Salim Saadeh (born November 25, 1949) is a politician. He served for third term as a representative for the Greek Orthodox Christians from Koura District (North Governorate, Lebanon) in the Lebanese parliament 2018-2022, respectively in 1992, 2000 and 2018 general elections. He is a prominent member of the Syrian Social Nationalist Party in Lebanon.

Early life and education
Saadeh was born in Amioun (Koura District, North Governorate, Lebanon), in November 25, 1949, to a Greek Orthodox Christian, yet very secular family. His father, Abdallah Saadeh, was a prominent general physician and general surgeon throughout Lebanon and the Middle East. Until the early 1950s, he travelled back and forth to Saudi Arabia to carry out some of his tasks such as running one of the main hospitals in the Kingdom as well as providing medical care to the late Saudi King Abdulaziz "Ibn Saud". His mother, May Saadeh, was also a renowned physician and the first female obstetrician and gynecologist in Lebanon.

Saadeh spent his childhood between the city of Tripoli, where he attended Tripoli Evangelical School and his hometown Amioun.

Career in the private sector
After graduating from the American University of Beirut, Saadeh joined the Lebanese cargo airline company TMA in 1974 as Director of the Planning Department. He left the company in 1976 in order to pursue his master's degree at Washington University in St. Louis in the United States.

Following his postgraduate studies, Saadeh joined Midmac Group - one of the largest contracting companies in the Middle East - in 1979. He was appointed as Director of Operations, a position he held until he was nominated as a member of parliament for the first time 1991.

Political career
In 1992, Saadeh was elected Member of the Lebanese Parliament for the Greek Orthodox Christian seat in Koura. He was not reelected for the seat in the 1996 elections. Saade was elected a second time in the 2000 elections and served until 2005.

On 11 February 2020, protesters during the Lebanese protests hurled stones at Saadeh's car when he was heading to a Parliament session. However, he was injured in the head, yet he went to attend the session after being hospitalized.

In 2022, Saadeh lost the elections.

Personal life
Saadeh married Norma Diab in 1982.

References

1949 births
Living people
Greek Orthodox Christians from Lebanon
Eastern Orthodox Christians from Lebanon
Syrian Social Nationalist Party in Lebanon politicians
Members of the Parliament of Lebanon
People from Koura District
American University of Beirut alumni
Washington University in St. Louis alumni